The Treasure of Bengal is a 1953 Italian-French adventure film directed by Gianni Vernuccio and starring Sabu. It is based on a novel by Emilio Salgari.

Plot

Cast 

Sabu as Ainur
 Luisella Boni as  Karma  
 Luigi Tosi as  Don Fernando 
 Georges Poujouly as  Tomby 
 Carla Calò as  Surama  
 Anand Kumar as  Uzake 
 Manuel Serrano as  Burka
  Pamela Palma  as The Dancer 
 Nino Marchetti

References

External links

Italian adventure films
French adventure films
1953 adventure films
Films based on works by Emilio Salgari
Films directed by Gianni Vernuccio
1953 films
Films set in Bengal
Films set in India
1950s French films
1950s Italian films